The Egyptian national handball team is the national handball team of Egypt and is controlled by the Egyptian Handball Federation.

Egypt is one of the finest handball teams from Africa along with Tunisia and Algeria.

Egypt has had two golden generations, one from 1991–2001 and a present one starting from 2019. The first generation was the first non-European team to reach the semifinals in the World Championships. While the current generation became the first African team to reach the semifinals in the Olympic tournament.

History
Egypt's first appearance at the IHF World Championship was in 1964, where they failed to win a single game.

After Egypt started developing their handball infrastructure, Egypt qualified for the 1993 tournament at Sweden. They were able to win a game this time, against Czechoslovakia and they were able to qualify to the second round.

Egypt's performance at the 1995 Championship rose Egypt to a respectable team. Egypt won all three matches in the first round, beating Brazil, Kuwait and Belarus. The team was widely expected not to survive the knockout stage, but beat four-time World Champions Romania in the round of 16. While they were later beaten at the quarterfinals against Croatia, the team was praised back home.

Egypt advanced to the quarterfinals every time between 1995 and 2001. They also reached 6th place at the 1996 Olympics and 7th at 2000. Egypt hosted the World Championship in 1999 for the first time, failing to reach the semi-finals after a loss against Russia.

In the 2001 IHF World Championship, Egypt beat Morocco, Portugal and Iceland, drew with the Czech Republic and lost to Sweden. At the knockout stage, Egypt beat fellow Africans, Algeria. At the quarterfinals, where Egypt has been knocked out three times prior, Egypt faced Russia again, winning the close game 21–19. After losses against France and Yugoslavia, Egypt placed fourth. This was the best performance by a non-European team until it was equaled by Tunisia in 2005 and beaten by Qatar in 2015.

Between 2003 and 2017, Egypt qualified to every tournament save for the 2012 Olympics, but failed to impress, never advancing to the quarterfinal. Egypt broke this streak at the 2019 World Championship, where they placed eighth. Egypt then went on to host the first 32-team Championship in 2021, finishing seventh after losing to reigning World Champions, Denmark on penalties, who later won the tournament.

Egypt beat their rivals Tunisia in their own court, qualifying to the 2020 Olympics. In the group stage, Egypt finished 2nd, after beating Portugal, Sweden, Bahrain and Japan, and losing to World Champions Denmark once again. They then won against Germany in the quarterfinals, progressing to the semifinals. They lost to France by a 4-goal margin, despite having had a 4-goal lead early on. In the Bronze Medal match, Egypt lost to Spain, placing 4th overall.

Competitive record
 Champions   Runners-up   Third place   Fourth place

Olympic Games

World Championship

African Championship

All-Africa Games
 1965 – 
 1973 – 
 1987 – 
 1991 – 
 1995 – 
 1999 – 
 2003 – 
 2007 – 
 2011 – 
 2015 – 
 2019 –

Mediterranean Games
 1979 – 6th
 1991 – 
 1993 – 4th
 1997 – 6th
 2005 – 5th
 2013 – 
 2022 –

Unofficial tournaments

MENA Games
 1961 – 
 1965 – 
 1992 – 
 1999 – 
 2007 – 
 2011 –

Islamic Solidarity Games

Team

Current squad
Squad for the 2023 World Men's Handball Championship.

Head coach: Roberto García Parrondo

Notable former coaches
  Zoran Živković
  Irfan Smajlagić
  David Davis
  Roberto García Parrondo

See also
 Dr. Hassan Moustafa- Current IHF President
 Egypt men's national junior handball team- Under-20 National team, 1-time World Champion
 Egypt men's national youth handball team- Under-18 National team, 1-time World Champion
 Egypt national beach handball team- 1-time World Champion

References

External links

IHF profile

Handball in Egypt
Men's national handball teams
H